South Dakota Highway 249 (SD 249) is a state highway in the U.S. state of South Dakota that extends from SD 47 to SD 34 in Buffalo County. The entire highway is located within Fort Thompson and is maintained by the South Dakota Department of Transportation (SDDOT). It is not a part of the National Highway System.

Route description
SD 249 begins in Fort Thompson at an intersection with SD 47 and treks northeast through open plains. The roadway continues in this direction for about  before curving to the east and merging with SD 34. SD 249 terminates at this intersection. The route is maintained by SDDOT. In 2012, the traffic on the road was measured in average annual daily traffic. The highway had an average of 500 vehicles.

Major intersections

References

External links

The Unofficial South Dakota Highways Page

249
Transportation in Buffalo County, South Dakota